Sigmund Riezler or Siegmund Riezler (after 1900 von Riezler; 2 May or 5 May 1843 in Munich – 28 January 1927 in Ambach) was a German historian.

Biography
He was educated at the University of Munich, and became a docent in 1869, and after ten years as head of the archives and library of Donaueschingen was made court and city librarian in Munich, in 1883, and director of the Maximilianeum in 1885.

Works
His works, dealing for the most part with Bavarian history, include: Das Herzogtum Bayern zur Zeit Heinrichs des Löwen (1867, with Karl Theodor von Heigel), Der Kreuzzug Kaiser Friedrichs I. (1869), the great Geschichte Baierns (8 volumes, 1878–1932), Die bayrische Politik im Schmalkaldischen Kriege (1895), and Geschichte der Hexenprozesse in Bayern (1896).

References

1843 births
1927 deaths
19th-century German historians
Writers from Munich
Ludwig Maximilian University of Munich alumni
German male non-fiction writers